Minaret Lake is a lake in the Ritter Range, a subrange of the  Sierra Nevada, in California. It is located in extreme northeastern Madera County, within the Ansel Adams Wilderness of the Inyo National Forest.

Minaret Lake is notable for being on the Sierra High Route.

It is near the fatal 2007 airplane crash site of Steve Fossett (Fossett's plane crashed north of the lake, near the Minaret Mine on Volcanic Ridge).

See also
List of lakes in California

References

Lakes of the Sierra Nevada (United States)
Lakes of Madera County, California
Inyo National Forest
Lakes of California
Lakes of Northern California